The Hermann-Hesse-Literaturpreis is a literary prize of Germany in honour of German-born Swiss writer, poet and Nobel Prize winner Hermann Hesse.

The award is presented in Karlsruhe. The prize sum is 15,000 Euros. Previous winners include Martin Walser, Hubert Fichte, Rafik Schami, Adolf Muschg, and Alain Claude Sulzer.

Not to be confused with the Calw Hermann Hesse Prize or the prize of the Internationale Hermann-Hesse-Gesellschaft (unofficial English name: International Hermann Hesse Society), which was awarded for the first time in 2017.

Recipients
The following have received the prize:

 1957: Martin Walser for Ehen in Philippsburg
 1962: Ernst Augustin for Der Kopf'
 1965: Hubert Fichte for Das Waisenhaus 1968: Hans Saner for Kants Weg vom Krieg zum Frieden 1971: Mario Szenessy for Lauter falsche Pässe 1974: Adolf Muschg for Albissers Grund 1977: Dieter Kühn for Ich, Wolkenstein 1980: Ernst-Jürgen Dreyer for Die Spaltung 1984: Natascha Wodin for Die gläserne Stadt 1988: Uwe Pörksen for Die Ermordung Kotzebues oder Kinder der Zeit 1991: Gerhard Meier for Land der Winde 1994: Rafik Schami for Der ehrliche Lügner 1997: Klaus Merz for Jakob schläft 1999: Markus Werner for Der ägyptische Heinrich 2001: Marlene Streeruwitz for Nachwelt 2003: Klaus Böldl for Die fernen Inseln 2005: Hans-Ulrich Treichel for Menschenflug 2007: Antje Rávic Strubel for Kältere Schichten der Luft 2009: Alain Claude Sulzer for Privatstunden 2012: Annette Pehnt for Chronik der Nähe 2014: Angelika Klüssendorf for April 2016: Christian Kracht for The Dead (Die Toten)
 2018: Thomas Hettche for unsere leeren herzen. Über Literatur 2020: Iris Hanika for Echos Kammern 2022: Sasha Marianna Salzmann for Im Menschen muss alles herrlich sein''

References

External links

German literary awards
Hermann Hesse